Klippitztörl (el. 1642 m.) is a mountain pass in the Austrian Alps in the Bundesland of Kärnten (or Carinthia).

It connects Wolfsberg with St. Veit. The pass road is 28 km and goes south at Bad St. Leonhard from Federal Highway B78 over the pass to Lölling-Graben, where it joins Federal Highway B92 south of Hüttenberg.

There is a ski resort at the Hohenwart, with a number of lifts. Along the road, there are many hotels and rental chalets.

See also
 List of highest paved roads in Europe
 List of mountain passes

References

External links
 Profile on climbbybike.com
 

Mountain passes of the Alps
Mountain passes of Carinthia (state)
Seetal Alps